Segner may refer to:

28878 Segner (2000 KL41), a Main-belt Asteroid discovered in 2000
Johann Andreas Segner (1704–1777), Carpatho-German mathematician, physicist, and physician
Segner (crater), lunar crater located northeast of the giant walled plain Bailly
Segner wheel, type of water turbine invented by Ján Andrej Segner in the 18th century